Co-production is a form of knowledge production based on the dynamic interaction between technology and society; where technical experts and other groups come together, with their different ways of viewing and analyzing the world and, in the process, generate new knowledge and technologies. It has a long history, particularly arising out of radical theories of knowledge in the 1970s and, beyond science and technology studies, is often applied to public services and administration and forms the basis of participatory development.

Description
Co-production forms part of Mode 2, a term used in the sociology of science to describe one of the modes—or ways—that knowledge is formed. In Mode 2, science and technology studies move from extreme technological determinism and social constructivism, to a more systemic understanding of how technology and society ‘co-produce’ each other. Co-production is functionally comparable to the concepts of causality loop, positive feedback, and co-evolution – all of which describe how two or more variables of a system affect and essentially create each other, albeit with respect to different variables operating at different scales. And as with these other concepts, if used too broadly/uncritically, co-production risks noetic flatness – if technology and society co-produce each other equally, the justification for maintaining the boundary between them dissolves (in which case actor-network theory may be invoked). Unless overlapping sets of boundary-work are employed, co-production may also fail to account for power differentials within each variable, (in this case, within technology and society).

Science, technology and society
From a more science, technology and society (STS) perspective, Sheila Jasanoff, has written that "Co-production is shorthand for the proposition that the ways in which we know and represent the world (both nature and society) are inseparable from the ways in which we chose to live in." Co-production draws on constitutive (such as Actor–network theory) and interactional work (such as the Edinburgh School) in STS. As a sensitizing concept, the idiom of co-production looks at four themes: "the emergence and stabilization of new techno-scientific objects and framings, the resolution of scientific and technical controversies; the processes by which the products of techno-science are made intelligible and portable across boundaries; and the adjustment of science’s cultural practices in response to the contexts in which science is done." Studies employing co-production often follow the following pathways: "making identities, making institutions, making discourses, and making representations"

Co-production of climate services 
A disconnect exists between the climate information that is produced by science (in terms of weather forecasts and climate projections) and what is needed by users to make climate-resilient decisions. The mismatch usually relates to time scales, spatial scales, and metrics. Co-producing climate services, by bringing together producers and users of climate information for dialogue, can lead to the creation of new knowledge that is more appropriate for use in terms of being tailored and targeted to particular decisions.

As in other fields, co-production of climate services, can create challenges due to differences in the incentives, priorities and languages of the various parties (often grouped into "producers" of information and "users" of information). Although there are no recipes for how to co-produce climate services, there are a number of building blocks and principles. Building blocks for co-production of climate services are:

 identifying key actors and building partnerships
 building common ground
 co-exploring need
 co-developing solutions
 co-delivering solutions
 evaluation.

Principles for co-production of climate services are:

 improve transparency of forecast accuracy and certainty
 tailor to context and decision
 deliver timely a sustainable services
 build trust
 embrace diversity and respect differences
 enhance inclusivity
 keep flexible
 support conscious facilitation
 communicate in accessible ways
 ensure value-add for all involved.

References

External links
Examples of initiatives to co-produce climate services include:
 Weather and Climate Information Services for East Africa (WISER)
 Future Climate For Africa (FCFA) 
 Enhancing National Climate Services initiative (ENACTS).

Science studies
Science and technology studies

ja:協働